Spies in Disguise is a 2019 American computer-animated spy comedy film produced by Blue Sky Studios and distributed by 20th Century Fox. Loosely inspired by the 2009 animated short Pigeon: Impossible by Lucas Martell, the film is directed by Troy Quane and Nick Bruno from a screenplay by Brad Copeland and Lloyd Taylor, and a story by Cindy Davis. It stars the voices of Will Smith and Tom Holland, alongside Rashida Jones, Ben Mendelsohn, Reba McEntire, Rachel Brosnahan, Karen Gillan, DJ Khaled, and Masi Oka in supporting roles. The plot follows a secret agent who is transformed into a pigeon by an intelligent young scientist; the two must then work together to stop a revenge-seeking cybernetic terrorist, and return the agent to his human form.

The film premiered at the El Capitan Theatre on December 4, 2019, and was theatrically released in the United States on December 25, 2019. It received generally positive reviews from critics, with praise for the animation, music, humor, and vocal performances (particularly Smith and Holland). It grossed $171.6 million worldwide against a $100 million budget.

It was the final film produced by Blue Sky Studios, as well as the only animated film from 20th Century Fox and Blue Sky after the acquisition of 21st Century Fox by Disney and the last animated film to use the 20th Century Fox name.

Plot

Lance Sterling, a cocky secret agent of H.T.U.V. (Honor, Trust, Unity and Valor), is sent to recover an attack drone from Japanese arms dealer Katsu Kimura in Japan. As soon as the buyer, cybernetically enhanced terrorist Killian, arrives, Sterling breaks in against the orders of H.T.U.V. director Joy Jenkins, defeats Kimura and his gang, and escapes with the briefcase containing the drone. Sterling returns to the H.T.U.V. headquarters to confront Walter Beckett, a socially inept MIT graduate and outcast young scientist, for equipping nonlethal weapons into his suit. Walter tries to convince Sterling that there is a more peaceful way to save the world but Sterling fires him before he can explain his latest invention: "biodynamic concealment".

Sterling discovers the briefcase to be empty and is confronted by Marcy Kappel, an internal affairs agent, who reveals footage of Sterling – actually Killian in a holographic disguise – leaving with the drone, labeling him as a traitor. Sterling escapes the H.T.U.V. and tracks down Walter to help him disappear. Meanwhile, Killian breaks into the H.T.U.V. covert weapons facility.

While searching Walter's home for his invention, Sterling ingests the concoction and transforms into a pigeon by undergoing "chromothripsis". Before Walter and Sterling can decide what to do next, Marcy and other H.T.U.V. agents chase the duo through the city, but the duo escape in Sterling's spy car. The two track down Kimura at a resort in Playa del Carmen, Mexico. There, they learn of Killian's whereabouts in Venice, Italy before Marcy and the H.T.U.V. can capture them again.

Arriving in Venice, Walter is confronted by the H.T.U.V., who are unaware of Sterling's condition. Revealing that she knows about Wendy, Walter's mother who was a police officer who died on duty, Marcy tries to convince him to help turn Sterling in, but Walter refuses. Suddenly, a drone distracts the H.T.U.V. and allows Walter and Sterling to escape. The two discover the drone carrying the H.T.U.V. agent database, and Walter retrieves it. Killian shows up, takes the database, and prepares to kill Walter. With help from hundreds of pigeons in the surrounding area, they distract Killian and flee. Disguised as Sterling once more, Killian escapes the H.T.U.V., shaking Marcy's suspicions of Sterling upon her seeing him with a robot hand.

Whilst underwater in a submarine, Walter reveals he planted a tracking device on Killian and locates him at the weapons facility. Walter perfects the antidote and successfully turns Sterling human again. Reaching Killian's hideout, Sterling is concerned about Walter's safety and sends him away in the submarine. Once inside, Sterling confronts Killian, but is knocked out and captured as Killian reveals he has mass-produced hundreds of drones to target everyone at the agency using the database as revenge for killing his crew in a past mission led by Sterling. Noticing Walter returning in the submarine, Killian destroys it; unbeknownst to them, Walter survives with the help of one of his inventions, the inflatable hug.

Once Walter frees Sterling, the two escape and contacts Marcy for support as the drones approach H.T.U.V. headquarters in Washington, D.C. Walter attempts to hack into Killian's bionic arm but when Killian realizes this, he tries to flee via air with a drone, but Walter catches up.  Walter risks his life by trapping Killian in the inflatable hug and deactivates the villain's arm as Walter himself falls, but Sterling, who has turned himself back into a pigeon, successfully flies for the first time and carries him to safety with help from other pigeons, while Killian is found and arrested.

Despite saving the world, Sterling – back in his human form – and Walter are fired for disobedience, but the H.T.U.V. rehire them as the agency could learn from Walter's more peaceful ways of handling villainy.

Voice cast
 Will Smith as Lance Sterling, "the world's most awesome spy", who is transformed into a pigeon by Walter
 Tom Holland as Walter Beckett, a socially inept scientific genius who graduated from MIT at age 15 and designs gadgets. He turns Sterling into a pigeon with a new invention of his, but must now help him return to his human form
 Jarrett Bruno as young Walter, voiced in the opening scene
 Ben Mendelsohn as Killian, a powerful technology-based terrorist mastermind with a left bionic arm that controls an array of weaponized drones that threatens the world
 Rashida Jones as Marcy Kappel, a security forces agent of internal affairs in pursuit of Lance Sterling, who she believes is a traitor
 Reba McEntire as Joy Jenkins, the director of H.T.U.V. and Sterling's superior
 Rachel Brosnahan as Wendy Beckett, a police officer, and Walter's mother who got killed on duty when her son was younger
 Karen Gillan as Eyes, an H.T.U.V. specialist in spectral analysis and quantum optical thermography who is paired with Ears
 DJ Khaled as Ears, an H.T.U.V. specialist in communications and ultrasonics who is paired with Eyes
 Masi Oka as Katsu Kimura, a Japanese arms dealer and an associate to Killian
 Carla Jimenez as Geraldine, a security agent at H.T.U.V.

Olly Murs makes an uncredited vocal cameo as a Junior Agent, while Mark Ronson voices an Agency Control Room Technician. The voice of Lance’s car, an Audi RSQ e-tron, is provided by Kimberly Brooks.

South Korean voice actors So Youn and Jang Min-hyuk provided the voices of Soo-min and Joon respectively, the protagonists in a South Korean television drama Walter is a fan of in the film. Jang also voiced Lance Sterling in the Korean dub of the film.

Production
On October 9, 2017, it was announced that development was underway on a film based on the animated short Pigeon: Impossible (2009), with Will Smith and Tom Holland set to voice the lead characters.

In October 2018, new additions to the voice cast included Ben Mendelsohn, Karen Gillan, Rashida Jones, DJ Khaled and Masi Oka. In July 2019, Reba McEntire and Rachel Brosnahan joined the cast, and in September 2019, Carla Jimenez was added as well.

The film is the directorial debut of Nick Bruno, and the second for Troy Quane, after having directed the short film The Smurfs: A Christmas Carol (2011).

The film was dedicated to the memory of Joe Kwong, who worked at Walt Disney Animation Studios and Blue Sky Studios before his death.

Music

Score
On June 12, 2018, it was reported that Theodore Shapiro was set to compose the film's score. The film's score album was released by Hollywood Records and Fox Music on December 27, 2019.

EP soundtrack

On June 11, 2019, it was announced that Mark Ronson would be the film's executive music producer. Head of Fox Music Danielle Diego expressed excitement at working with Ronson, stating that "his unique blend of vintage soul and funk exceptionally captures the soul of [the] film." On November 22, 2019, an original song for the film entitled "Then There Were Two", performed by Ronson and Anderson .Paak, was released. Two days later, an extended play album titled Mark Ronson Presents the Music of Spies in Disguise was announced, featuring five new songs written for the film as well as Rob Base & DJ E-Z Rock's "It Takes Two". The EP was released digitally on December 13, 2019, by RCA Records.

Track listing

Release
The film was originally scheduled for release on January 18, 2019, by 20th Century Fox. The film was delayed to April 19, 2019, and then to September 13, 2019. On May 10, the film was delayed once more, to December 25, 2019, due to The Walt Disney Company's acquisition of 21st Century Fox.

The film had its world premiere at the El Capitan Theatre in Hollywood, on December 4, 2019.

Home media
Spies in Disguise was released in Ultra HD Blu-ray, DVD, Blu-ray and by 20th Century Fox Home Entertainment on March 10, 2020.

Reception

Box office
Spies in Disguise grossed $66.8 million in the United States and Canada, and $104.9 million in other territories, for a worldwide total of $171.6 million.

In the United States and Canada, the film was released on Wednesday, December 25, alongside Little Women, 1917, and Just Mercy as well as the wide expansion of Uncut Gems, and was projected to gross $19–23 million from 3,502 theatres over its five-day opening weekend. The film made $4.8 million on Christmas Day and $4.1 million on its second day. It went on to make $13.2 million during its opening weekend, for a total of $22.1 million over the five-day Christmas period, finishing fifth. In its second weekend the film made $10.1 million, finishing sixth. In its third weekend, it grossed $5.1 million, dropping 50.9% from the previous weekend and finishing at 10th place. The film's budget is undisclosed. IndieWire estimated that it may have been $100 million or more, based on previous Blue Sky films.

Critical response 
The site's critical consensus reads, "A cheerfully undemanding animated adventure that's elevated by its voice cast, Spies in Disguise is funny, fast-paced, and family-friendly enough to satisfy." Metacritic gave the film a weighted average score of 54 out of 100, based on 22 critics, indicating "mixed or average reviews". Audiences polled by CinemaScore gave the film an average grade of "A−" on an A+ to F scale, while those surveyed by PostTrak gave it an average 3.5 out of 5 stars.

Peter Bradshaw of The Guardian gave the film three out of five stars, calling it an "entertaining family adventure", and praising the vocal work of Smith and Holland.

Kwak Yeon-soo, a reporter at The Korea Times, wrote that the film failed to convey its message because of its "lackluster narrative". Kwak also pointed out that the film tried to attract audiences there by putting references to the South Korean popular culture, and that it ended up exemplifying Walter Beckett's "weird" personality.

Accolades

References

External links

 
 

2019 films
2019 3D films
2019 comedy films
2019 computer-animated films
2019 directorial debut films
2019 action comedy films
2010s adventure comedy films
2010s American animated films
2010s children's adventure films
2010s children's comedy films
2010s children's animated films
2010s English-language films
2010s satirical films
2010s spy comedy films
2010s teen comedy films
20th Century Fox films
20th Century Fox animated films
20th Century Fox Animation films
3D animated films
African-American animated films
American 3D films
American computer-animated films
American children's animated action films
American children's animated adventure films
American children's animated comedy films
American action comedy films
American adventure comedy films
American spy comedy films
American satirical films
American teen comedy films
Blue Sky Studios films
Chernin Entertainment films
Features based on short films
Cyborg films
Fiction about government
Films about scientists
Films about shapeshifting
Films about technology
Films about terrorism
Films directed by Nick Bruno
Films directed by Troy Quane
Animated films set in Italy
Animated films set in Japan
Films set in Mexico
Films set in Venice
Animated films set in the United States
Films set in Washington, D.C.
Japan in non-Japanese culture
Films scored by Theodore Shapiro
Films with screenplays by Brad Copeland